The 19th Rifle Corps was a corps of the Soviet Red Army. It was part of the 23rd Army. It took part in the Great Patriotic War.

Organization 
 142nd Rifle Division
 115th Rifle Division

Commanders 
 Kombrig Vsevolod Yakovlev (14.07.1937 - 8.01.1938),
  Major General Filipp Starikov  (01.09.1938 -01.01.1940)        
 Lieutenant General M.N. Gerasimov (09.07.1940 - 05.08.1941),
 Major General Filipp Starikov (06.08.1941 - 22.09.1941)
 Major General Mikhail Dukhanov (04.10.1941 - 24.10.1941)

Rifle corps of the Soviet Union